Wondang Station is on Ilsan Line in Goyang, Gyeonggi-do. Goyang City Hall is nearby.
There is a lot of building work in the area undertaken by SK, Daewoo and other companies; including many apartment complexes, shopping malls and a multiplex cinema.

Station layout

Entrance
 Exit 1, 2 : Way to NH bank of Seongnae
 Exit 3 : Mineral spring

References

Information around the station
Goyang City Hall
Goyang Eoullim Nuri
Goyang Eoullim Nuri Byeolmuri Stadium (home stadium of Goyang Citizens’ Soccer Team, K4 League, Korea)
Goyang Eoullim Nuri Ice Maru
Deokyang Senior Welfare Center
Deokyang Health Center
City Council
Wondang Market
Baskin Robbins Ilsan Wondang Branch
Gyeonggi-do Goyang Office of Education
Seongra Elementary School
Seongsa 1-dong Administrative Welfare Center
Wondang Nonghyup Wondang Station Branch
Wondang Social Welfare Center
Wondang District
The living environment is a 5-minute walk from Wondang Market and Hanaro Mart’s local food market, so you can gain vitality and use it in a variety of ways within the Wondang Central Business District. E-Mart, Save Zone, IKEA, and Starfield are 15 minutes away by car. It has educational conditions such as Seongracho, Wondangcho, Seongsa Elementary and Middle School, Oullimnuriwa Literature Center, and Goyang City Library.

Seoul Metropolitan Subway stations
Railway stations opened in 1996
Metro stations in Goyang
Seoul Subway Line 3